Elke Walther  (born 1 April 1967) is a German football coach and former goalkeeper for international games. She is a member of the Germany women's national football team. She was part of the team at the 1991 FIFA Women's World Cup. On club level she plays for VfL Sindelfingen in Germany.

Career

Club 
From 1990 to 1992 season, Walther first belonged to the Bundesliga VfL Sindelfingen, before transferring to SSG 09 Bergisch Gladbach and then to TuS Niederkirchen without a point game. Since the 2003-04 season she was a member of SC Freiburg for four seasons, in which she made her debut on May 30, 2004 (19th matchday) in the 3-1 defeat at home against Hamburger SV. She played her fourth and last Bundesliga game for the club of May 6, 2007 (18th matchday) in the 2-6 defeat in the guest game against FCR 2001 Duisburg. In the 2003-04 season she was assistant coach and since the 2006-07 season she has been the goalkeeping coach at SC Freiburg.

References

1971 births
Living people
German women's footballers
Germany women's international footballers
Place of birth missing (living people)
1991 FIFA Women's World Cup players
Women's association football goalkeepers
UEFA Women's Championship-winning players